The Rya Formation (Swedish: Ryaformationen) is a geologic formation in Skåne County, southern Sweden. It is Early to early Middle Jurassic (early Sinemurian to late Aalenian) in age. The Rya Formation comprises siltstones, claystones, sandstones, mudstones and rare coal beds. The formation overlies the Höganäs Formation and is overlain by the Vilhelmsfält and Mariedal Formations.

The formation was deposited in the Höganäs and Øresund Basins that formed in the earliest Jurassic as part of the break-up of Pangea. The depositional environment of the formation ranges from continental to open marine.

The Rya Formation has provided fossils of a number of sharks, ammonites, bivalves and ichnofossils. Iron ooids containing erratic boulders, called Geschiebe in German, attributed to the Rya Formation were found in Holstein, northern Germany.

Description 
The Rya Formation crops out in Colonus Shale Trough of western Scania.
The formation overlies the Höganäs Formation and is overlain by the Vilhelmsfält Formation in the Helsingborg area and by the Mariedal Formation in the area of Landskrona and Kävlinge. The Rya Formation is subdivided, from base to top, into the Döshult, Pankarp, Katslösa and Rydebäck Members. The formation is found in the Ängelholm, Helsingborg, Landskrona and Kävlinge areas. In southwest Skåne, the Rya Formation is missing or only
poorly developed. In the Øresund Basin between Sweden and Denmark, the formation is truncated by the Basal Middle Jurassic unconformity.

Erratic boulders, called Geschiebe in German, attributed to the Rya Formation and containing iron ooids were found in Holstein, northern Germany.

Subdivision 
Döshult Member
The early Sinemurian Döshult Member (Swedish Döshultsledet)  comprises coarse-grained cross-layered sandstones and siltstones in the lower part, and is dominated by dark clays and marls rich in marine fossils in the upper part. Presently, the basal part of this member is exposed at three localities in the Helsingborg area. These contain mineralogically and texturally mature, trough cross-bedded sandstones, commonly with herringbone structures showing north and south oriented paleocurrent directions. The occurrence of herringbone structures in well-sorted sand suggests high energy foreshore to subtidal marine depositional conditions for the lower part of the member. In an abandoned quarry in northwest Skåne (Gantofta brickpit in the Helsingborg area, outcrop very limited at present) the upper part of the Döshult Member commences with bioturbated marine nearshore sands, including burrows, as well as abundant marine invertebrate body fossils. This is followed by a bioturbated shelf mudstone with storm-deposited sand and silt intercalations (tempestites). A massive red mudstone with scarce marine body fossils and burrows follows, which is interpreted as having been deposited rapidly, in a low energy but oxidizing environment. The youngest part of the succession comprises siltstones and mudstones, with carbonate-rich beds, deposited in a shallow marine setting. Coaly detritus, muscovite, very small shells and shell fragments, and framboidal pyrite nodules (0.1–0.3 mm in diameter) are characteristic constituents of this member.

Pankarp Member
The dark mudstones of the Döshult Member are overlain by the Pankarp Member (Swedish Pankarpsledet) with a sharp conglomeratic boundary. In westernmost Skåne, the member has been observed in small diameter drill cores. There, the member is subdivided into a lower unit of variegated clays and shales, a middle, poorly sorted silty to sandy unit including a coal bed, and an upper monotonous mudstone unit which is silty and rich in organic matter at the base, and reddish–greenish at the top. It presents different coloration probably due to different degrees of oxidation of iron in the claystone. In the uppermost part of one core, the Pankarp Member comprises lenticular bedded heteroliths with Planolites burrows.

Katslösa Member

Sedimentological interpretations are mainly based on the results of petrographical studies of museum collections. The Katslösa Member yields a rich marine microfauna and macrofauna, and it is dominated by homogeneous mudstone deposited in a marine low-energy environment. Is composed mostly by marine green, brown and dark gray claystones and sandstones. Thin beds of matrix-rich quartz wackes are common. They are typically mineralogically mature but texturally highly immature with abundant angular sand grains. The matrix comprises organic matter, micrite, mica and clay minerals. In thin section, the sandstones show evidence of intense burrowing, which has obliterated depositional structures. Scattered berthierine ooids, as well as authigenic siderite crystals have been observed in the member.

Rydebäck Member
It is only known from subsurface material in westernmost Skåne, and sedimentological analysis is based on observations from two wells (Rydebäck–Fortuna-1 and -4). These layers were deposited in small bands during a sea regression, and consist of marine gray, black, green and reddish brown sand and siltstones. The member comprises a uniform succession of muddy arenites with a rich marine microfauna (mostly foraminifera), and represents deposition in an offshore low-energy environment. The sediments are strongly burrowed, which has caused an effective mixing of sand and mud, resulting in the forming of quartz wackes. The sand is quartz-rich, and grains are typically well rounded. Berthierine ooids are common constituents of the sediment.

Depositional environments 

Tethys Sea transgression entailed formation of fossil-bearing marine deposits in Skane, also associated with an increased tectonic activity. Deposition of the Rya Formation began with nearshore coarse clastics, and continued with offshore mudstones with tempestites (the Döshult Member), followed by offshore muddy sediments with a brief non-marine interval (the Pankarp Member), and ended with deposition of open marine low-energy deposits (Katslösa and Rydebäck Members). The marine Rya Formation shows an overall fining-upwards trend, and an up-section bathymetric deepening of the depositional environment. The depositional environment in western Skåne was either physically protected from the storm energy due to basin topography, or deposition in Skåne took place below storm wavebase. Berthierine ooids occur scattered in the Katslösa
Member and are increasingly abundant up-section in the Rydebäck Member. There is a possibility that iron ooid formation was promoted by precipitation of iron and silica from volcanic fluids rising up through the substrate, as has been reported from modern marine sediments offshore Indonesia. This hypothesis has emerged with the publication of age data for the volcanic rocks in Skåne, which now appear to be comparable in age to the prominent iron ooid-bearing deposits, i.e. the Rydebäck Member and the Röddinge Formation.

Age 
Based on foraminifers, ammonites and ostracods, the Döshult Member is dated to the early Sinemurian, the Pankarp Member to the late Sinemurian, the Katslösa Member to the late Sinemurian to early Pliensbachian and the Rydebäck Member to the late Pliensbachian to late Aalenian.

The formation is time-equivalent with the Röddinge Formation of the Vomb Trough, the Djupadal Formation in central Skane and the Sorthat Formation of Denmark, with which it shares the Spheripollenites–Leptolepidites and Callialasporites–Perinopollenites Zones. The formation also correlates with the Fjerritslev Formation of the Danish Basin, and the Gassum Formation of the Øresund Basin. The storm-dominated, hummocky cross-stratified Hasle Formation on Bornholm is contemporaneous with the muddy Katslösa Member of the Rya Formation.

Basin history 

Basement
The basins where the Rya Formation was deposited form part of the Sorgenfrei-Tornquist Zone (STZ) of the Trans-European Suture Zone, the boundary between Baltica to the northeast and Peri-Gondwana to the southwest. The orogeny was active in the Late Ordovician, or approximately 445 million years ago.

At the Carboniferous-Permian boundary around 300 Ma, the area was influenced by the Skagerrak-Centered Large Igneous Province, another large igneous province stretching across the North Sea, the eponymous Skagerrak between Denmark and Sweden and to the northwest up to northern England and Scotland.

Break-up of Pangea
The basins of southern Sweden and eastern Denmark were formed during the latest Triassic and earliest Jurassic. During this time the Central Atlantic magmatic province (CAMP), with an estimated  the largest igneous province in Earth's history, was formed to the present southwest of the Danish-Swedish realm. In the Skåne area, the Central Skåne Volcanic Province was active during the time of deposition of the Rya Formation, commencing around the Sinemurian-Pliensbachian boundary. The earliest magmatism was partly emplaced into and across pre-existing extensional basin structures. The first and the main volcanic phase of this volcanic province occurred in the Early Jurassic (late Sinemurian to Toarcian) at 191–178 Ma. Analysis of the volcanic rocks produced by this Jurassic volcanism suggests a continental Strombolian-type eruptive character close to the oceans of the Early Jurassic. No correlative pyroclastic beds have yet been identified in sedimentary basins surrounding central Skåne.

Toarcian
During deposition of the Rydebäck Member, the Toarcian turnover happened. This event at the Pliensbachian-Toarcian boundary characterized by widespread anoxic conditions globally, led to the extinction of various groups of flora and fauna. Taxa inhabiting the upper water column were unaffected by anoxia and included ammonites and belemnites. Epifaunal taxa adapted to low-oxygen conditions, such as the buchiids, posidoniids and inoceramids, flourished in the post-extinction environment during the survival interval.

Economic geology 
A study on the geothermal potential of reservoirs in the Øresund Basin published in 2018 by Erlström et al. gave results of the formation together with the Gassum and Höganäs Formations, giving the following characteristics of the three Early Jurassic formations:
 Net sand thickness - 
 Porosity - 18 to 34%
 Permeability - 50 to 1500 mD
 Cl− concentration - 120 to 190 gram/liter
 Productivity index - 7.0 m3/hr/bar

A study published in the same year analyzing the CO2 storage potential of the Rya and Höganäs Formations concluded a storage capacity of 543 megatons of carbon dioxide.

The organic content of the Jurassic strata in Skåne is typically dominated by gas-prone kerogen (type III), which is below, or at the onset of, thermal maturity.

Paleoenvironment 
The sedimentological evolution of the Jurassic in southwestern Skåne, specially the Rya Formation, has provided depth diverse data about its different environments, specially on those samples recovered on the Höllviken-2 core and sidewall cores from the FFC-1 well. The unit was linked on all its sedimentological history with the main Fennoscandinavian land. The local succession in the Höllviken Halfgraben and Barsebäck Platform has measured  continue during most of the Triassic and Early Jurassic times. Inte western part of the Höllviken Halfgraben during the Hettangian–Pliensbachian succession there is evidence of higher subsidence rate along the Öresund Fault, indicating tectonically controlled deposition and the presence of a submarine high  at the west of this fault. In the east is the Skarup Platform, interpreted as a Jurassic high based on its incomplete or missing Rhaetian–Lower Jurassic strata, along redeposited spores and pollen in the Höllviken Halfgraben and increased sand output, that point to this zone as the major freshwater terrestrial source. This deposits shows several nearshore environments, from offshore marine environment probably below wave base on the sinemurian level, as proven by the presence of well cemented fine sand and 2 m thick clay dominated heterolites, that change to more marine influenced flaser bedded heterolites with some strongly bioturbated horizons and convolute beds in the Pliensbachian, and end in the Pliensbachian–Lower Toarcian with a sandy seashore setting with high energy lenticular beds. Some sections are suggested to be tidal flat zones and/or distal bar deltaic deposits. Coeval with the Rydebäck member, at Anholt (Fjerritslev Formation) where studied several levels that point to a connected fluvial system. Concretely the Upper Pliensbachian-Toarcian boundary marks the beginning of a major regression, which continued through the Toarcian and Aalenian. The discovery of the foraminifera Eoguttuliiia liassica, Bony Fishes and Scolecodonts, points that the Pliens-Toar boundary has a shallow water environment, possibly of reduced salinity. The Pollen and spores, identical of those found on the Rydebäck member (Vilhelmsfält Bore No. 1 and
Karindal bore no. 1), increase, and the dinoflagellate cysts decrease, suggesting more proximal shoreline. This layers, on both Anholt and the Rydebäck member, are considered to represent  a regression from marine inner shelf environments to near lagoonal or deltaic conditions during the late Pliensbachian and early Toarcian, but with light marine influence, as show the presence of Dactylioceras on the Rydebäck member. The sequence points concretely than in both units The Late Pliensbachian sediments at were deposited in a storm-influenced Inner Shelf setting, that changed on the Lower Toarcian into a more restricted, marginal-marine conditions with delta progradation. Then in the late Toarcian increased brackish conditions, to end on a short marine encroachment during the Early Aalenian.

The study of the Jurassic sediments has allowed to know that the basement rocks of southern Sweden were deeply weathered in Late Triassic-Cretaceous times, with formed saprolites on the sub-mesozoic basement and high amount of Kaolinite on the stronger weathered profiles, opposed to smectite on the less weathered ones. Thus, fluvial currents released smectite-rich weathering material to the Late Triassic–Jurassic receiving basins. The members of the Rya Formation recover a transition from deltaic to parallic coast and shallow marine, dominated by kaolinite, along with peaks of illite and smectite. The record of this minerals showed that at the time of deposition of the Rya Formation, mid-latitude warmth and pronounced humidity to drier pseudomediterranean climates allowed on the denuded bedrock in the Fennoscandian Shield, composed of Gneisses or Granites, at places intersected by Dolerite dykes, fracturation and active erosion/weathering. The coeval Djupadal Formation volcanic ash falls at the east Skarup Platform-Cenntral Skane Volcanic Province, may have diluted the marine sediments, with raised smectite content. The pronounced mineralogical maturity of most Swedish post-Norian Mesozoic arenites confirms widespread feldspar destruction in the weathering profiles of the Paleozoic crystalline basement at the north, as a consequence of the increased humidity. A fish tooth recovered from the lower Toarcian of the North West German Basin presents a radiogenic seawater value of −6 ε-units, which is quite counter-intuitive to the idea of massive unradiogenic crustal-derived inputs from Laurasia. Clastic fractions found on the same layer suggest brief radiogenic Nd influxes from the Skåne flood basalts erupted at this time.

Pliensbachian 
Lower-late Pliensbachian Layers at Katslösa are similar in faunal composition. The Katslösa Member composition suggest deposition on a Low Energy Marginal marine environment with absence of changes in the salinity (As proven by the presence of Echinoderms and other low salt intolerant fauna), with active bottoms filled by traces of diverse invertebrates and abundance of Bivalves. The Upper Pliensbachian section that mark the appearance of the Rydebäck Member continues the stable salinity environment with increased presence of Echinoderms, but lack of a diverse Bivalve fauna as in the older section. This unit was deposited likely on a marine setting more proximal to the shore and low-energy, more strongly burrowed than older layers. The presence of Selachian fauna can be more likely derived from a more suitable depositional setting for this remains than a biota turnover. Palynology in this section is dominated by spores in the Karindal bore no. 1, suggesting a humid climate on nearby emerged lands.

Toarcian
Toarcian layers of the formation where influenced by the ongoing vulcanism located in the Central Skåne Volcanic Province (Djupadal Formation), as, marine water influence is observed in the main outcrop of the last unit, where enriched Zeolite by Barium is suggested to derive from oceanic water, that may have circulated as hydrothermal flows in the lapilli tuff and facilitating diagenetic changes. Is also known by palynological analysis on the Bonnarp Cone, where saltwater/brackish acritarchs like Leiosphaera and Leiofusa or Dinoflajellates like Nannoceratopsis where recovered. This section also recovers the increased influence of Terrestrial weathering measured in the layers after the Toarcian AOE, as seen in the Vilhelmsfalt borehole, where plant remains increase their presence, suggesting a regression of the coast influenced by the increased volcanic-derived materials. The Palynology in this section is dominated by the Pollen of Chasmatosporites (Cycads), with at least six species recovered, playing more than 50% of the total palynological samples, implicating a clear dominant role of the producer of this Pollen and suggesting along the increased amount of Cheirolepidiaceae pollen and general decrease of spores a shif towards a more arid climate on nearby settings.

Fossil content 
The formation has provided fossils of typically marine fauna. With the exception of a continental coal bed, the formation is marine in character. Shark teeth were reported from the Rydebäck Member. Apart from a few teeth of the hybodont Hybodus reticulatus, the shark fauna from the Rya Formation is exclusively neoselachian.
Fish

Annelida 

 Serpula terquemi
 Serpula quinquesulcata
 Serpula cf. raricostati
 Eklexibella johanni

Echinodermata

 Isocrinus ranae sp. nov.
 Pentacrinus basaltiformis
 Balanocrinus subteroides
 Hispidocrinus scalaris
 ?Acrosaleniidae Indeterminate

Ammonites

 Coroniceras rejnesi
 Megarietites meridionalis
 Paracoroniceras crossi
 Agassiceras nodulatum
 Arnioceras cf. falcaries
 Arnioceras sp. indet.
 Eparietites sp. indet.
 Cymbites striaries
 Asteroceras obtusum
 Oxynoticeras oxynotum
 Oxynoticeras? sp. indet.
 Promicroceras planicostatum
 Promicroceras sp. juv.
 Euagassiceras resupinatum
 Euagassiceras spinaries
 Euagassiceras lundgreni
 Euagassiceras cf. lundgreni
 Uptonia jamesoni
 Polymorphites angustus
 Amaltheus margaritatus
 Pleuroceras spinatum
 Pleuroceras hawskerense
 Amauroceras ferrugineum
 Echioceras raricostatum
 Tragophylloceras ibex
 Prodactylioceras davoei
 Dactylioceras tenuicostatum
 Dactylioceras cf. semicelatum
 Eleganticeras elegantulum

Belemnites

 Passaloteuthis alveolata
 Passaloteuthis apicicurvata
 Passaloteuthis cf. virgata
 ?Passaloteuthis sp.
 Pseudohastites charmouthensis
 Pseudohastites cf. arundineus
 "Belemnites" elongatus
 "Belemnites" milleri

Brachiopods 

 Zeilleria perforata
 Zeilleria numismalis
 Spiriferina walcotti
 Rhynchonella deffneri

Bivalves

 Chlamys interpunctata
 Chlamys textoria
 Chlamys janiformis
 Chlamys subulata
 Chlamys tullbergi
 Chlamys textaria
 Chlamys interpunctata
 Oxytoma sinemurensis
 Oxytoma inaequivalvis
 Oxytoma scanica
 Astarte sp.
 Astarte angelini
 Astarte fructuum
 Astarte scanensis
 Astarte fortuna 
 Astarte deltoidea
 Astarte oerbyensis
 Astarte ryensis
 Tutcheria cingulata
 Tutcheria cf. rickardsoni
 Pseudopis sp.
 
 Entolium sp.
 Homomya sp.
 Leda sp.
 Liogryphaeaarcuata sp.
 Nucula sp.
 Nucula distinguenda
 Nuculana sp.
 Nuculana zieteni
 Nuculana doris
 Palaeoneilo sp.
 Palaeoneilo galatea
 Palaeoneilo bornholmiensis
 Palaeoneilo oviformis
 Pleuromya sp.
 Rollieria sp.
 Rollieria bronni
 Grammatodon cypriniformis
 Grammatodon sinuatus
 Grammatodon subrhomboidalis
 Barbatia pulla
 Cardinia tollini
 Cardinia expansa
 Cardinia ingelensis
 Cardinia kullensis
 Trigonia primaeva
 Trigonia modesta
 Tancredia arenacea
 Tancredia securiformis
 Tancredia erdmanni
 Tancredia johnstrupi
 Tancredia lineata
 Sphaeriola kurremolinae
 Protocardia philippiana
 Protocardia oxynoti
 Protocardia truncata
 Eotrapezium gerrnari
 Eotrapezium pullastra
 Eotrapezium heberti
 Eotrapezium menkei
 Anisocardia luggudensis
 Platymya aquarum
 Homomya ovalis
 Homomya venulithus
 Homomya centralis
 Homomya librata
 Arcomya decora
 Arcomya cf. elongata
 Pleuromya forchhammeri
 Pleuromya corrugata
 Goniomya heteropleura
 Gervillia angelini
 Gervillia scanica
 Gervillia hagenowi
 Gervillia sjögreni
 Isognomon sp. 
 Lima duplicata
 Lima pectinoides
 Plagiostoma succincta
 Limea acuticostata
 Limea katsloesensis
 Entolium hehli
 Entolium calvum
 Entolium cingulatum
 Entolium lundgreni
 Pseudopecten aequivalvis
 Dimyodon sp.
 Plicatula spinosa
 Plicatula orbiculoides
 Terquemia arietis
 Anomia pellucida
 Liastrea hisingeri
 Liogryphaea arcuata
 Liogryphaea lata
 Lioqryphaea regularis
 Modiola hillana
 Modiola ruuthi
 Modiola cf. tenuissima
 Modiola scalprum
 Mytilus cf. lamellosus
 Myoconcha decorata
 Taeniodon nathorsti

Gasteropods

 Actaeonina nathorsti
 Actaeonina cf. striata
 Chrysostoma  cf. solarium
 Chemnitzia sp.
 Trochus cf. imbricatus
 Trochus laevis
 Ptychomphalus cf. expansus
 Kalchreuthia frankei

Scaphopods

 "Dentalium" hexagonale
 Prodentalium bandeli
 Laevidentalium sp.
 Laevidentalium elongatum
 Progadilina spaethi
 Progadilina subtrigonalis
 Baltodentalium weitschati

Ostracods

 Citharina inaequistriata
 Marginulina spinata spinata
 Astacolus denticulina carinata
 Brizalina liassica amalthea
 Ogmoconchella danica
 Ogmoconchella mouhersensis
 Ogmoconchella adenticulata
 Pleurifera harpa
 Ogmoconcha amalthei amalthei
 Cristacythere crassireticulata
 Nanacythere simplex

Mites

 Hydrozetes nsp.

Ichnofossils

 Chondrites sp.
 Rhizocorallium sp.
 Diplocraterion sp.
 Planolites sp.
 Skolithos sp.
 Teichichnus sp.

Plant Remains
Ammonites where found on layers with plant fossils. Fragments of Dactylioceras were found at a depth of 170 m in the Vilhelmsfalt borehole, together with plant remains and
beautifully preserved Pelecypods. The plant material, probably derived from watercourses emptying in the neighborhood, consists mostly of small fragments that seem to have been intimately sedimented with the muddy material that flocculated on meeting the seawater. Other specimen, Arnioceras sp. indet. occurs on what appears to be a transitional environment, probably a back-beach with coalified fragments of plants, some of the large. Probably due to the shell being washed to land due to a storm.

Palynology

Plant Macrofossils

See also 
 List of fossiliferous stratigraphic units in Sweden
 Kristianstad Basin
 Toarcian formations

 Djupadal Formation, Central Skane
 Marne di Monte Serrone, Italy
 Calcare di Sogno, Italy
 Mizur Formation, North Caucasus
 Sachrang Formation, Austria
 Saubach Formation, Austria
 Posidonia Shale, Lagerstätte in Germany
 Ciechocinek Formation, Germany and Poland
 Krempachy Marl Formation, Poland and Slovakia
 Lava Formation, Lithuania

References

Bibliography 

 

 

  

  
   E-

External links 

Geologic formations of Denmark
Geologic formations of Sweden
Jurassic System of Europe
Early Jurassic Europe
Middle Jurassic Europe
Jurassic Denmark
Jurassic Sweden
Sinemurian Stage
Pliensbachian Stage
Toarcian Stage
Aalenian Stage
Siltstone formations
Shale formations
Sandstone formations
Mudstone formations
Coal formations
Coal in Sweden
Open marine deposits
Shallow marine deposits
Paleontology in Sweden
Formations
Denmark–Sweden border